The Lynnville–Sully Community School District is a rural public school district and serves the towns of Lynnville, Sully and Searsboro and surrounding areas in southeastern Jasper and western Poweshiek counties, with a small portion of Mahaska County.

The school, which serves all grade levels pre K–12 in one building, is located at 12476 Highway F62 E, in Sully.

The school's mascot is the Hawk. Their colors are Columbia blue and gold.

History
The independent school district of Lynnville was formed in March 1870.

In 1910, the Lynn Grove township had 22 teachers and an enrollment of 207.  Sully had two teachers and an enrollment of 98 pupils.

Schools
Lynnville–Sully Elementary School
Lynnville–Sully Middle School
Lynnville–Sully High School

Lynnville–Sully High School

Athletics 
The Hawks compete in the South Iowa Cedar League Conference in the following sports.

Cross country (boys and girls)
 Girls' state champions - 1995, 1996
Volleyball (girls)
Football (boys)
 State champions - 1986
Basketball (boys and girls)
Girls' state champions - 1997, 1998, 1999
Wrestling (boys and girls)
Track and field (boys and girls)
Golf (boys and girls)
Baseball (boys)
 State champions - 1988
Softball (girls)

See also
List of school districts in Iowa
List of high schools in Iowa

References

External links
 Lynnville–Sully Community School District

Education in Jasper County, Iowa
Education in Mahaska County, Iowa
Education in Poweshiek County, Iowa
School districts in Iowa
School districts established in 1870
1870 establishments in Iowa